SNPJ can refer to:
S.N.P.J., Pennsylvania, a borough in Pennsylvania, United States
Slovene National Benefit Society, a fraternal organization